Platinum is the fifth studio album by American country music singer and songwriter Miranda Lambert. It was released on June 3, 2014, by RCA Nashville.

Lambert wrote or co-wrote eight of the album's 16 tracks while working with a host of session musicians and songwriters, as well as guest performers Little Big Town, The Time Jumpers, and Carrie Underwood. The album was produced by Frank Liddell, Chuck Ainlay, and Glenn Worf.

Platinum debuted at number one on the Billboard 200, becoming Lambert's first to top the chart, while selling 180,000 copies in its first week. It received widespread critical acclaim and earned Lambert a Grammy Award for Best Country Album as well as a CMA Award and ACM Award in the same category. The album was certified platinum for sales of one million copies in the United States.

Writing and recording
Lambert wrote or co-wrote eight of the album's 16 tracks. The album features collaborations with Little Big Town ("Smokin' and Drinkin'") and The Time Jumpers ("All That's Left"), as well as a duet with Carrie Underwood on "Somethin' Bad". It was recorded in sessions at Cyclops Sound in Los Angeles, Dave's Room in Hollywood, and the Nashville-based studios Ronnie's Place, Ben's Studio, Sound Stage Studios, St. Charles Studio, and The House.

Release and promotion 
Platinum was released by RCA Nashville on June 3, 2014. It debuted at number one on both the Billboard 200 and Top Country Albums charts while selling 180,000 copies in the United States, becoming the highest first-sales week of Lambert's career. It was also her first album to reach the top of the Billboard 200, and marked her fifth consecutive number-one debut on the Top Country Albums, making her the first artist in the history of the chart to start her career with five number-one albums. It debuted at number one on the Canadian Albums Chart with first-week sales of 9,300 copies. On February 1, 2016, it was certified platinum by the Recording Industry Association of America (RIAA).  By September 2016, the album had sold 850,000 copies in the US.

Four singles were released in promotion of the album: the lead single "Automatic", the top-20 hit "Little Red Wagon", "Smokin' and Drinkin'", and "Somethin' Bad". Lambert debut the latter song with Underwood at the 2014 Billboard Music Awards on May 18, 2014, and performed it again on June 4, during the CMT Music Awards. In support of Platinum, she embarked on a concert tour of North America in mid 2014, featuring Justin Moore and Thomas Rhett as her opening acts.

Critical reception

Platinum was met with widespread critical acclaim. At Metacritic, which assigns a normalized rating out of 100 to reviews from mainstream publications, the album received an average score of 86, based on 11 reviews.

In a review published by Cuepoint, Robert Christgau hailed Platinum as the year's most daring and consummate big-budget record, featuring "apolitical de facto feminism at its countriest". The New York Times critic Jon Caramanica found it "vivacious, clever and slickly rowdy", showing Lambert had finally become "a sophisticated radical, a wry country feminist and an artist learning to experiment widely but also with less abrasion". Stephen Thomas Erlewine from AllMusic said the record was shrewdly produced with Lambert's attempts at modern pop songs sequenced ahead of the more authentic country material, while Will Hermes wrote in Rolling Stone that Lambert incorporated both traditional and alternative elements from country into her homespun, feminine perspective. Spin magazine's Dan Hyman was less enthusiastic, singling out the collaborations on "Smokin' and Drinkin'" and "Something Bad" as contrived appeals to pop audiences on what was an otherwise consistent and carefully crafted record.

At the end of 2014, Platinum was voted the 12th best album of the year in the Pazz & Jop, an annual poll of American critics published by The Village Voice. Christgau, the poll's creator, named it the year's second best record in his year-end list for The Barnes & Noble Review. The album was also ranked fifth and nineteenth best by Rolling Stone and Spin, respectively. At the 2014 CMA Awards, it won in the "Album of the Year" category. It also earned Lambert the Best Country Album award at the 57th Grammy Awards in 2015.

Track listing

Personnel

Musicians

Brad Albin – upright bass on "All That's Left"
Jessi Alexander – background vocals
Richard Bennett – banjo, bouzouki, acoustic guitar, electric guitar, tiple
Jams Byous – background vocals
Matt Chamberlain – drums, percussion
Dr. G.K. Drakoulias – background vocals
Glen Duncan – fiddle, acoustic guitar, mandolin
Fred Eltringham – percussion
Karen Fairchild – background vocals on "Smokin' and Drinkin'"
Larry Franklin – fiddle and background vocals on "All That's Left"
Paul Franklin – steel guitar on "All That's Left"
Nicole Galyon – background vocals
Vince Gill – electric guitar and background vocals on "All That's Left"
Warren Givens – background vocals
Ranger Doug Green – acoustic guitar and background vocals on "All That's Left"
Mallary Hope Whitener – background vocals
Jedd Hughes – electric guitar, baritone guitar
John Barlow Jarvis – keyboards, piano, synthesizer
Carolyn Dawn Johnson – background vocals
Jay Joyce – dobro, acoustic guitar, electric guitar, keyboards, mandolin, Hammond organ, synthesizer
Miranda Lambert – lead vocals
Stephanie Lambring – background vocals
Greg Leisz – acoustic guitar, steel guitar
Heather Little – background vocals
Audra Mae – background vocals
Gene Miller – background vocals
Ashley Monroe – background vocals
Eddie "Scarlito" Perez – acoustic guitar, electric guitar
Marty Raybon – background vocals
Andy Reiss – electric guitar on "All That's Left"
Mike Rojas – piano, synthesizer
Mando Saenz – harmonica
Kimberly Schlapman – background vocals on "Smokin' and Drinkin'"
Randy Scruggs – acoustic guitar, electric guitar, national steel guitar, slide guitar
Dawn Sears – vocals on "All That's Left"
Kenny Sears – fiddle and background vocals on "All That's Left"
Aubrie Sellers – background vocals
Gwen Sebastian – background vocals
Joe Spivey – fiddle and background vocals on "All That's Left"
Chris Stapleton – background vocals
Harry Stinson – background vocals
Phillip Sweet – background vocals on "Smokin' and Drinkin'"
Jeff Taylor – accordion, piano, and background vocals on "All That's Left"
Billy Thomas – drums on "All That's Left"
Carrie Underwood – vocals on "Somethin' Bad"
Jimi Westbrook – background vocals on "Smokin' and Drinkin'"
Glenn Worf – bass guitar, upright bass

Production

Chuck Ainlay – Engineer, Mixing
Dave Bianco – Engineer
Paul Cossette – Assistant
Brittany Hamlin – Production coordination
Kam Luchterhand – Assistant
Gavin Lurssen – Mastering
Randee St. Nicholas – Photography
Matt Rausch – Engineer
Leslie Richter – Assistant
Brandon Schexnayder – Assistant 
Matt Wheeler – Engineer

Charts

Weekly charts

Year-end charts

Decade-end charts

Certifications

References

External links
 

2014 albums
Miranda Lambert albums
RCA Records albums
Albums produced by Chuck Ainlay
Albums produced by Frank Liddell
Grammy Award for Best Country Album